The Newham North East by-election, in London Borough of Newham, on 9 June 1994 was held after long-serving Labour Member of Parliament (MP) Ron Leighton died. A safe Labour seat, it was won by Stephen Timms, who would go on to retain the East Ham seat which replaced it in 1997.

Candidates
 Richard Archer was the Natural Law Party candidate. He was also a candidate for the party in the European elections of the same year in the London North East constituency.
 Vida Garman, a pornographic model, ran as a publicity stunt for the Daily Sport newspaper, which wanted to take advantage of free postage for electoral leaflets.
 Philip Hammond was chosen as the Conservative Party candidate. He was director of a medical equipment and the chairman of Lewisham East Conservative Association.
 Jo Homeless had changed her name by deed poll in order to contest the election on a campaign of housing the homeless.
 Alec Kellaway was the nominated candidate for the Liberal Democrats however immediately prior to the election Kellaway announced that he was leaving the Liberal Democrats and joining the Labour Party. Consequently, there was no official Liberal Democrat standing in the election.
 Anthony Scholefield was the candidate for the United Kingdom Independence Party.
 Stephen Timms, the Labour candidate, had previously served as the leader of the local council for four years.

Results

The results for the previous election were:

References

Newham North East by-election
Newham North East,1994
Newham North East,1994
Newham North East by-election
Newham North East by-election